Chamaesomatidae is a family of millipedes belonging to the order Chordeumatida.

Genera:
 Asturasoma Mauriès, 1982
 Chamaesoma Ribaut & Verhoeff, 1913
 Krauseuma Mauriès & Barraqueta, 1985
 Marboreuma Mauriès, 1988
 Meinerteuma Mauriès, 1982
 Speudosoma Ribaut, 1927
 Xystrosoma Ribaut, 1927

References

Chordeumatida
Millipede families